Rockfield is an unincorporated community in Warren County, in the U.S. state of Kentucky.

History
A post office called Rockfield has been in operation since 1866. The community was named for the rocky terrain near the original town site.  The ZIP Code for Rockfield is 42274.

References

Unincorporated communities in Warren County, Kentucky
Unincorporated communities in Kentucky